USS LCT-242 was a Landing Craft Tank, Mark V landing craft built for the United States Navy in World War II. Like most of the ships of her type, she was not named and known only by her designation.

LCT-242 was built at Pidgeon-Thomas Iron Works in Memphis, Tennessee and delivered in September 1942.

She was assigned to the European Theatre as a part of LCT Flotilla 10 in the Mediterranean.

On 2 December 1943, a circling torpedo impacted and sank LCT-242 off Naples.

References

External links
 
 LCT assembly line at Pidgeon-Thomas Iron Works, c. 1944

Landing craft
Ships built in Memphis, Tennessee
1942 ships
World War II amphibious warfare vessels of the United States